Someone Marry Barry is a 2014 American romantic comedy directed and written by Rob Pearlstein and starring Tyler Labine, Lucy Punch, Damon Wayans, Jr., and Hayes MacArthur.

A group of childhood friends plot to get rid of their socially inappropriate friend by finding him a wife. Miraculously, he meets his female equal, making their problems double.

Cast 
 Tyler Labine as Barry Burke
 Damon Wayans, Jr. as Desmond
 Lucy Punch as Melanie Miller
 Hayes MacArthur as Rafe
 Thomas Middleditch as Kurt
 Frankie Shaw as Camille
 Ed Helms as Ben
 Ginger Gonzaga as Juanita
 Amanda Lund as Rachael
 Jerry Minor as Taxi Driver
 Greg Germann as Bill
 Brett Gelman as Goker
 Joe Lo Truglio as Sammy (Barry's Barry)

Production 
On July 23, 2012, The Hollywood Reporter reported that Labine, Punch, and Wayans, Jr. had joined the cast of the film written and directed by Pearlstein. On November 1, 2013, it was announced that FilmBuff will release the film on February 13, 2014, in theaters and on VOD.

Filming 
The principal photography of the film began on July 23, 2012, in Los Angeles.

References

External links 
 
 

2014 films
American romantic comedy films
2014 romantic comedy films
Films about weddings
Films shot in Los Angeles
2010s English-language films
2010s American films